The Confederación de Unidad Sindical de Guatemala (CUSG) is a national trade union center in Guatemala. It is affiliated with the International Trade Union Confederation.

References

Trade unions in Guatemala
International Trade Union Confederation
Trade unions established in 1983